Vladimir Smirnov (born 13 April 1978 in Klaipėda) is a former Lithuanian cyclist.

Palmares
2000
 National Road Race Champion
2001
1st Gran Premio Nobili Rubinetterie
3rd National Road Race Championships

References

1978 births
Living people
Lithuanian male cyclists